The following are the members of the Dewan Undangan Negeri or state assemblies, elected in the 2004 state election and by-elections. Also included is the list of the Sarawak state assembly members who were elected in 2006.

Perlis

Kedah

Elected members

Seating arrangement

Kelantan

Terengganu

Penang

Perak

Pahang

Selangor

Negeri Sembilan

Malacca

Johor

Sabah

Sarawak

2006–2011

Notes

References

2004 elections in Malaysia